A common room is a group into which students (and sometimes the academic body) are organised in some universities, particularity in the United Kingdom, normally in a subdivision of the university such as a college or hall of residence, in addition to an institution-wide students' union. They represent their members within the hall or college, operate certain services within these institutions such as laundry or recreation, and provide opportunities for socialising. There are variations based on institutional tradition and needs, but classically the following common rooms will exist:
 A junior common room (JCR) – for undergraduate students
 A middle common room (MCR) – for post-graduate students (in colleges with a large number of post-graduate students)
 A senior common room (SCR) – for academic members of the college

Common rooms are particularly found at collegiate universities such as Oxford, Cambridge,  Durham, York and Lancaster, but can also be found (often only the JCR) at non-collegiate universities, where they are normally associated with halls of residence. A significant difference between colleges and halls of residence generally is that students continue to be members of a college when not resident in the college; thus college JCRs serve all students who are members of the college, whether or not they live in college accommodation, while hall JCRs serve only residents of that hall. 

As well as in the UK, organisations known as common rooms are found in universities in Australia, Ghana, Ireland, Singapore and the US 
In addition to this, each of the above terms may also refer to an actual common room designated for the use of these groups, and at some universities has only this meaning. At the University of Cambridge, the term combination room (e.g., "junior combination room") is also used, with the same abbreviations.

United Kingdom 
Common rooms are found at almost all collegiate universities and in halls at a few non-collegiate universities. Student common rooms may be classified as students' unions under the Education Act 1994. Until the Charities Act 2006, common rooms (and other students' unions) were exempt charities, but under that act 
and the successor Charities Act 2011 they are now required to register with the Charity Commission if they have an income of £100,000 per annum or higher. , eight common rooms are registered with the commission, all from colleges of Durham University. Like other students' unions, student common rooms may appoint sabbatical officers; this is common at Durham but rare at other universities. As colleges vary in size between universities – the median Durham college had 1400 students in 2021/22, while the median Oxford college had 640 students – so do the sizes of their common rooms.

Collegiate universities

Oxford
The earliest junior common rooms at the University of Oxford, dating back to the 17th century, were private student clubs, limited to richer students who could afford their membership fees, and known for drinking and debauchery. With the reforms of Oxford in the mid-19th century, there was a crackdown on JCR activities, with Corpus Christi going as far as to disband its JCR in 1852. In 1868 New College moved to dissolve its JCR after a particularly egregious incident. An alternative solution was put forward by Alfred Robinson, a tutor at the college, which saw the JCR come under college oversight and, by including membership in the college battels, making it an inclusive society of all undergraduates in the college. Rather than a rich students' drinking club, the JCR became the centre of undergraduate life and the main point of contact between the college and the undergraduates.

By the end of the 19th century, similar arrangements were put in place at almost all Oxford colleges. When post-graduate numbers increased dramatically in the 1960s, similar arrangements, modelled on the JCRs, were put in place for them in the shape of middle common rooms.

A typical college now has a JCR for undergraduates, an MCR for graduates and an SCR for its fellows. JCRs and MCRs have a committee, with a president and so on, that represent their students to college authorities, the Oxford University Student Union (OUSU), etc., in addition to being an actual room for the use of members. SCRs typically have a president, an academic member of the body who deals with higher-level administrative matters pertaining to the SCR, such as inviting proposed visiting fellows to the body and identifying invited lecturers to any particular college event. SCRs are typically characterised by a copious provision of coffee, newspapers, and moderately informal space for academics to think and discuss ideas.

Following the Charities Act 2006, student common rooms had the option of registering as independent charities or of registering with their college, with some common rooms taking each route. At Magdalen, for example, which was one of the first colleges to complete the process, the JCR voted to become an independent charity while the MCR registered with the college. St Catherine's JCR "declared independence" from the college authorities in 2015 in protest against financial controls imposed by the college.

There exist several exceptions to the standard common room system. Instead of maintaining a separate JCR and MCR, St Benet's Hall maintained a Joint Common Room (JCR) which jointly represented both undergraduate and graduate students, until the hall's closure in 2022. Additionally, although Wadham College maintains a separate JCR and MCR, its entire student population is represented by a combined students' union (SU).

Alternative names are sometimes used for college MCRs. Brasenose College has the "Hulme Common Room" (HCR), and University College has the "Weir Common Room", named in honour of college alumni. At Christ Church, St Antony's and Templeton the representative bodies for postgraduate students are called "graduate common rooms" or "GCRs". At some graduate colleges such as Wolfson, St. Cross and Linacre College, students and fellows share a single common room.

The JCR and MCR presidents of all affiliated Oxford common rooms, in addition to their OUSU reps, are automatically voting members of OUSU's governing council, which meets fortnightly during term to decide on virtually all aspects of OUSU's policy. the OUSU council meetings take place in odd-numbered weeks of the university term. JCR presidents also get together in even-numbered weeks for meetings of the presidents' committee (popularly known as prescom). MCR presidents also get together up to three times a term for meetings of the MCR presidents' committee (popularly known as MCR-prescom).

In addition, colleges sometimes have additional common rooms, such as the "Summer Common Room" at Magdalen College, or the "Alumni Common Room" at St John's College. These are sometimes, but not always, associated with a particular section of the student or academic body.

Cambridge 
At the University of Cambridge, common rooms as rooms have existed for a long time. However, it was only in the mid 20th century that the idea of the JCR committee as a representative body of the students arose. Prior to this, the room had generally been administered by the 'amalgamated clubs' – the college's sport societies – sometimes through a JCR committee formed by these societies, sometimes simply through a JCR secretary. At Magdalene, the JCR committee was appointed by the tutors rather than by students until the late 1950s, while at Caius the previous year's committee ('the Gargoyles') appointed their successors until 1963. The last college to move from a single officer to an elected committee was Fitzwilliam in 1969.

The same abbreviations, JCR, MCR, and SCR are used for combination rooms and common rooms. The JCR represents undergraduates, with postgraduate students being members of the middle combination room. In some colleges, postgraduates are members of both the MCR and JCR: for example, at St John's, where the MCR is known as the Samuel Butler Room or at Peterhouse. Most colleges also have an SCR. At Pembroke the common rooms are called "parlours", such as the Junior Parlour and Graduate Parlour. At Jesus College, Cambridge, the JCR is known as "The Jesus College Students' Union", with its physical space being the Marshall Room.

Similarly, Sidney Sussex College, Cambridge, has both a JCR, MCR, and SCR along with a Sidney Sussex College Students' Union of which all students are members.

At Homerton College the JCR is known as the Homerton Union of Students. The president is the only sabbatical JCR or equivalent officer at a Cambridge college.

JCRs and MCRs have elected committees to represent their interests within their colleges and in the central students' union.  The committees are almost universally led by a president and a range of other elected positions to cover specific areas or interest or functions (e.g. secretary, treasurer, entertainment). There is a great deal of variety between the colleges in terms of the roles that the JCRs and MCRs undertake, how much influence they have in college affairs and how many functions they provide. Nearly all are responsible for organising Freshers Week and frequent entertainments.

Cambridge Students' Union's student council has two members per college, corresponding to one for each JCR and MCR except where a college has only a single student common room.

Durham 

At Durham University, the standard division followed at most colleges is:
 A JCR for undergraduate students
 An MCR for postgraduate students
 An SCR for academics who are members of the college

Some colleges have slight differences from the standard arrangement:
The College of St Hild and St Bede has a Students' Representative Council (SRC), which includes both undergraduates and postgraduates at the college.
St Aidan's College combines the MCR and SCR into one SCR whereby the postgraduates and senior members belong to one common room as a whole.
St Cuthbert's Society combines the JCR and MCR into one JCR. 
St. John's College has "St. John's Common Room" (SJCR), representing undergraduates, an MCR, representing postgraduates, for university students in St John's Hall, along with the Cranmer Common Room (CCR) representing theological college students in Cranmer Hall.
Ustinov College, which does not take undergraduates, has a graduate common room (GCR) for its students.

Membership of the college JCR or MCR is not obligatory, and costs an additional fee, but the vast majority of students choose to join. Following the removal of exempt charity status from students' unions by the Charities Act 2006, some of the student common rooms at the maintained colleges remained independent charities, recognised as student unions under the Education Act 1994, while most voted to become 'student organisations' within the university's Durham Student Organisations (DSO)framework. Common rooms can vote to leave the DSO framework and become registered charities, or vice-versa. As of 2022, seven of the fifteen maintained colleges have independent JCRs (or equivalent) and eight are DSOs. Among the independent colleges, St John's Common Room is an independent charity (taking in the MCR and Cranmer Common Room). For student common rooms that are independent, the college council in each maintained college is responsible for ensuring (on behalf of the university's council) that the common room follows the requirements placed on students' unions by the 1994 act. Similar to many university-level students' unions, all but two of the seventeen colleges at Durham have at least one paid sabbatical officer for their JCR (or equivalent), and some have more. A framework for senior common rooms is under development .

Durham Students' Union's Assembly includes a representative from each college as well as the chairs of the JCR and MCR presidents' committees.

York 
Colleges have an elected 'college committee' representing students, called either a JCR committee or a college student association (CSA) committee. As of 2023, most colleges have a student association, but Derwent and James still have JCRs and Wentworth, a graduate-only college, has a Graduate Student Association.

Lancaster 
At Lancaster, undergraduates are members of one of eight colleges (with a further college for postgraduate students). Each undergraduate college is a quasi-autonomous body within the university, and each divides its members into junior and senior common rooms. These terms are more indicative of the collective student/staff bodies than actual space,  although each college has actual common rooms set aside for junior members. Senior members are less fortunate due to a current policy by the university's estates department of removing senior common room space from college control – refurbishing these as teaching rooms or putting them on the central booking system, so SCR members cannot just "drop in". The term "JCR", although intended to refer to all junior members of a college, is often used to refer to elected members of each college's JCR executive.  Each JCR executive organises a range of social and sporting activities for its college while also offering welfare support for its junior members. The president and vice president represent their college at the student union council and on a range of university committees, and many JCR executive members sit with SCR members on the college syndicate – the governing body of each college.

Within the graduate college, the graduate students' association (GSA) takes on the role of an "MCR". Lancaster has a students' union which co-ordinates activities between the different colleges, and the JCR and GSA executives are considered to be standing committees of the union council.

Non-collegiate universities

Bristol 
Halls at the University of Bristol have student-run junior common rooms to organise social events and represent students in the residence. The JCR is the committee rather than the student body as a whole.

Leeds 
At Leeds, only one hall continues to have a JCR. Devonshire Hall is the last of the university's traditional halls. Many traditions were adopted from Oxford and Cambridge, such as gowned formal dinners and carol services. The hall has a JCR (the Tabbron Junior Common Room) rather than a common room as at the other halls of the university, and the student committee is styled as the "JCR executive" rather than as the "hall exec". A Senior Common Room is also present. Other halls such as Lyddon, Charles Morris, Oxley, Ellerslie, Tetley, Bodington Hall and Weetwood formerly followed the same format; however, the use of the term JCR in these halls has fallen into disuse since 2000 - in the case of the first four halls through modernisation, or in the case of the latter three halls through closure.

Nottingham 
At the University of Nottingham there are junior common room committees in many of the halls of residence that organise social events for residents of those halls.

Reading 
University of Reading JCRs are part of the Reading University Students'Union. There is an elected JCR committee at each hall of residence, which represents the students living in that hall and organise social events.

The Staff Common Room (SCR) is the staff social club at the university. It began life in 1897 as the College Common Room, taking in both staff and students. It has at various times been termed the Staff Common Room and the Senior Common Room. Its membership includes academic, administrative and technical staff.

Other countries

Australia

University of New England
The University of New England has a residential college system, with the colleges having JCRs that organise social events.

Ghana

University of Ghana 
The University of Ghana has JCRs representing students from its undergraduate halls as well as in the business school.

Ireland

Trinity College 
Trinity Hall, Dublin has the only JCR at Trinity College. The JCR is the representative body for students living at the hall, and primarily provides services to resident students, while Trinity College Dublin Students' Union is the main representative body for student members of the college. The college also has a number of 'student spaces' termed JCRs around the campus. Trinity Hall also has an SCR, consisting of the warden, deputy warden and assistant wardens.

Singapore

National University of Singapore
The National University of Singapore has elected junior common room committees in its halls of residence, as well as senior common room committees. The JCR and SCR work together to plan events and the JCR also represents the students in the hall to the university administration, the university-wide students' union, and to JCRs in other halls.

United States

Harvard 
At Harvard College, each house has a senior common room, composed of academics, alumni and others from the local area. However, the student representative bodies in the houses are known as "HoCo" (short for "house committee"), with the term "junior common room" referring to an actual room.

References 

Academic culture
Academic terminology
Oxbridge
Rooms
Student culture
Terminology of the University of Cambridge
Terminology of the University of Oxford